Elana Kuczynski Arnold is an American children's and young adult author. Her 2017 novel What Girls Are Made Of was a finalist for the 2017 National Book Award for Young People's Literature, and her 2018 novel Damsel was named a Michael L. Printz Award Honor title in 2019.

In 2022, three of Arnold's books (Damsel, Red Hood, and What Girls Are Made Of ) were listed among 52 novels banned by the Alpine School District following the implementation of Utah law H.B. 374, “Sensitive Materials In Schools."

Biography
Arnold obtained a Bachelor of Arts degree in Comparative Literature from University of California, Irvine. In 1998, she Master of Arts degree in English and Creative Writing from the University of California, Davis.

Arnold now teaches with Hamline University's Master of Fine Arts program focusing on Writing for Children and Young Adults.

She lives in Southern California.

Awards and honors
Nine of Arnold's book are Junior Library Guild selections: A Boy Called Bat (2017), Bat and the Waiting Game (2018), Damsel (2018), Bat at the End of Everything (2019), The House That Wasn't There (2021), Red Hood (2021), Starla Jean (2021), and Just Harriet (2022).

In 2021, Publishers Weekly named Red Hood one of the top ten young adult novels of the year.

Publications

Young adult novels
Sacred (2012)
Burning (2013)
Splendor (2013)
Infandous (2015)
What Girls Are Made Of (2017)
Damsel (2018)
Red Hood (2020)
The Blood Years (2022)

Middle grade books

The Question of Miracles (2015)
Far From Fair  (2016)
The House That Wasn't There (2021)
Just Harriet (2022)

A Boy Called Bat series 

A Boy Called Bat (2017)
Bat and the Waiting Game (2018)
Bat and the End of Everything (2019)

Starla Jean series 
Starla Jean, illustrated by A. N. Kang (2021)
Starla Jean Takes The Cake (2022)
Starla Jean Cracks the Case (2023)

Picture books 
What Riley Wore (2019)
All by Himself? (2022)
Pip and Zip (2022)

References

External links
 Official site

American women children's writers
American children's writers
21st-century American women writers
Living people
Year of birth missing (living people)
University of California, Davis alumni
University of California, Irvine alumni
Hamline University faculty